Shelby Lake is a  natural lake in Ballard County, Kentucky, and is one of only three major natural lakes in the state. It is part of the Ballard County Wildlife Management Area and owned by the Kentucky Department of Fish and Wildlife Resources.

References

Protected areas of Ballard County, Kentucky
Lakes of Kentucky
Bodies of water of Ballard County, Kentucky